The Favourite Son (original title: Le Fils préféré) is a 1994 French drama film directed by Nicole Garcia and written by François Dupeyron, Jacques Fieschi and Garcia. It stars Gérard Lanvin, Bernard Giraudeau and Jean-Marc Barr.

Cast
Gérard Lanvin as Jean-Paul Mantegna
Bernard Giraudeau as Francis
Jean-Marc Barr as Philippe
Roberto Herlitzka as Raphaël
Margherita Buy as Anna Maria
Karin Viard as Martine
Antoinette Moya as Odetta
Pierre Mondy as The dentist

Awards and nominations
César Awards (France)
Won: Best Actor – Leading Role (Gérard Lanvin)
Nominated: Best Actor – Supporting Role (Bernard Giraudeau)
Nominated: Best Director (Nicole Garcia)
Nominated: Best Film
Karlovy Vary Film Festival (Czech Republic)
Nominated: Crystal Globe (Nicole Garcia)

References

External links
 

1994 films
1990s French-language films
Films featuring a Best Actor César Award-winning performance
Films directed by Nicole Garcia
Films scored by Philippe Sarde
1994 drama films
French drama films
1990s French films